= Theodora Noeva =

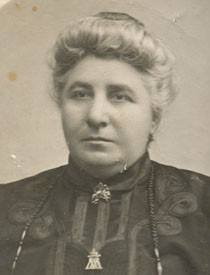

Theodora Noeva (Bulgarian: Теодора Ноева) (fl. 1937), was a Bulgarian women's rights activist.

Noeva co-founded and edited the first Bulgarian women's magazine, Женский свят ('Women's world') in 1893–99 in collaboration with her brother Atanas Manov, in which she spoke in favor of women's rights to a professional life and equal pay, and is regarded as one of the first pioneers of women's rights and gender equality in her country. In 1896, she attracted great attention by asking to be registered as a voter in Varna. She was married to the rich entrepreneur George Noah of Varna. She was also a noted philanthropist and created fund for the education of boys and a refuge for old people, for which she was awarded a medal from Boris III in 1937.
